Stormland can refer to:

 Stormland (film), 2011
 Stormland (video game), 2019